Biggs is an English surname. Notable people with the surname include:

Asa Biggs (1811–1878), American politician
Andy Biggs (b. 1958), American politician from Arizona
Barton Biggs (1932–2012), money manager
Basil Biggs (1819–1906), American laborer and veterinarian
Benjamin T. Biggs (1821–1893), American politician
Casey Biggs (b. 1955), American actor
Cecil Biggs (1881–1944), British rugby player and cricketer
Christopher Ewart-Biggs (1921–1976), British diplomat assassinated by the PIRA
D. E. Biggs (1860–1924), American politician
Electra Waggoner Biggs (1912–2001), American sculptor
Gregory Biggs (1964–2001), American car accident victim
Hermann Biggs (1859–1923), American physician and Public Health pioneer
Ian Biggs (b.1963), Australian diplomat
J. Biggs (b. 1965), wrestling manager Clarence Mason
Janet Biggs (b. 1959), American artist
James Crawford Biggs (1872–1960), American lawyer and politician
Jason Biggs (b. 1978), American actor
John Biggs (London politician) (b. 1957), British politician
John Biggs Jr. (1895–1979), American Chief Justice
John B. Biggs (b. 1934), educational psychologist and novelist
John H. Biggs (b. 1936), Boeing director
John Biggs-Davison (1918–1988), British politician
Margaret Biggs (b. 1929), British children's writer
Max Biggs (1923–1990), American professional basketball player
Norman L. Biggs (b. 1941), British mathematician
Norman Biggs (1870–1908), Wales international rugby player
E. Power Biggs (1906–1977), British-American organist
Rachel Charlotte Biggs (1763-1827), was an English author, letter writer and spy
Ralph Biggs (b. 1976), American basketball player
Richard Biggs (1960–2004), American actor
Riley Biggs (1900–1971), American football player
Ronnie Biggs (1929–2013), British criminal
Rosemary Biggs (1912–2001), British haematologist
Roxann Biggs, American actress Roxann Dawson
Selwyn Biggs (1872–1943), Wales international rugby player
Tony Biggs, Australian radio personality
Tyrell Biggs (b.1960), American boxer
Verlon Biggs (1943–1994), American football player
 Mr. Biggs, stage name of Ronald Isley

See also 
 Place names: Biggs (disambiguation)
 Bigg (disambiguation)
 Briggs (disambiguation)

English-language surnames